Cornelius Smith Jr. (born March 18, 1982) is an American actor best known for his portrayal of Marcus Walker on the ABC drama series Scandal from 2015 to 2018, and Frankie Hubbard on the ABC soap opera All My Children from December 2007 until September 2011. He received a Daytime Emmy Award nomination for Outstanding Younger Actor in a Drama Series in 2009.

In 2018 Smith was cast in the upcoming film Against All Enemies.

Early life 
Although born in San Diego, Smith grew up in Detroit, Michigan. Smith graduated from the Class of 2000 from Cass Tech High School in Detroit. Then he went on to Southern Methodist University in Dallas. Cornelius is a member of Alpha Phi Alpha fraternity. After attending Southern Methodist University for his undergraduate education, he went to New York University and received his Master of Fine Arts in Acting.

Personal life 
In May 2018 Smith married Stephanie Lilly Smith in Mexico.

Filmography

Film

Television

Stage credits

Video games

Awards

References

External links

1982 births
Cass Technical High School alumni
Living people
Male actors from Detroit
American male soap opera actors